Desire and Hell at Sunset Motel is a 1991 neo-noir black comedy written and directed by Alien Castle and produced by Donald P. Borchers. It stars Sherilyn Fenn, Whip Hubley, David Hewlett, David Johansen, and Paul Bartel.

Plot
In 1955, a toy salesman and his wife turn a business trip into a brief vacation by planning to visit Disneyland, which has just opened. They stay at the Sunset Motel in Anaheim, California, where affairs and sexual crimes among the motel guests and staff quickly develop and cause trouble.

Cast
  Sherilyn Fenn  ...  Bridget "Bridey" DeSoto
  Whip Hubley  ...  Chester DeSoto
  David Hewlett  ...  Deadpan Winchester  
  David Johansen  ...  Auggie  
  Kenneth Tobey  ...  Captain Holiday  
  Paul Bartel  ...  The Manager  
  Parker Whitman  ...  The Boss  
  Shannon Sturges  ...  Louella

References

External links
 
 

1992 films
American black comedy films
American independent films
American neo-noir films
1990s black comedy films
1992 comedy films
Films set in Orange County, California
Films set in motels
Films shot in New Orleans
Films shot in Los Angeles County, California
1990s English-language films
1990s American films